The Cherokee Arboretum at Audubon Acres (130 acres) is an arboretum and natural area located in the East Brainerd neighborhood of Chattanooga, Tennessee. It became an official arboretum in 2003 and is one of several properties protected by the Chattanooga Audubon Society.

The arboretum contains a walking trail (approximately 1 mile) that interprets the forest in the context of Native American culture. It features trees and woody plants labeled with scientific, common, and Cherokee names written in the Cherokee Syllabary. Cherokee uses are also described.

See also
 Cherokee Trail Arboretum (Chattanooga, Tennessee)
 List of botanical gardens in the United States

External links
 Audubon Acres - Chattanooga Audubon Society

Arboreta in Tennessee
Botanical gardens in Tennessee
Geography of Chattanooga, Tennessee
Protected areas of Hamilton County, Tennessee
Tourist attractions in Chattanooga, Tennessee
Nature reserves in Tennessee
Native American history of Tennessee